2nd Vitranc Cup was an alpine skiing competition, held between 2–3 March 1963 in Kranjska Gora, SR Slovenia, Yugoslavia. They were hosting two FIS 1A international events.

Official results

Giant slalom 
On 2 March 1963, GS with vertical drop at 510 m and 2,100 metres long was held. Marijan Magušar was coursesetter with 1 run and 64 gates. Start was at 6th pillar of the top chairlift (1,345 m), where family course joins with classic "Bukovnik downhill". Then it continued at the midpart of dowhnill course and then on the GS slope, above and over S-section, then direct to the finish line at Brsnina hayloft (845 m).

Slalom 
On 3 March 1963, slalom was held in front of 2,000 people. First run was held on "Bedanc" and second on "Vitranc" course, both with vertical drop 175 m.

References

External links
 

International sports competitions hosted by Yugoslavia
1963 in Yugoslav sport
International sports competitions hosted by Slovenia
Alpine skiing competitions
Alpine skiing in Slovenia
1963 in Slovenia

sl:2. Pokal Vitranc (1963)